Five dollar note may refer to:

 Australian five-dollar note
 Canadian five-dollar note
 New Zealand five-dollar note
 United States five-dollar bill